The 3rd Medium Regiment, Royal Canadian Artillery was raised as a medium artillery regiment of the Canadian Army on January 26, 1942. Formed in Petawawa, Ontario, it was made up of two former coastal batteries, the 5th, from the west coast, and the 87th, from the east coast.

History
The regiment was equipped with the 5.5-inch medium gun or howitzer, later converting to the 4.5-inch Gun (Canadian Specification). In March 1942, the 3rd Medium was assigned to I Canadian Corps in England; in July 1944, the unit was transferred to II Canadian Corps for service in Northwest Europe. It was later assigned to the First Canadian Army level of command under 2 Army Group RCA (2nd AGRCA). The 3rd Medium Regiment, RCA, was disbanded on November 16, 1945.

References 

Regiments of Canada in World War II
Artillery regiments of Canada
Medium artillery regiments
Military units and formations established in 1942
Military units and formations disestablished in 1945